Trapezites praxedes, commonly known as the southern silver ochre or praxedes skipper, is a species of butterfly in the family Hesperiidae. It is endemic to Australia, where it occurs in New South Wales, Queensland and Victoria.

Description 
From above, the forewings each exhibit three large yellow central spots, a median yellow spot near the dorsum and a band of three small yellow subapical spots, while the hindwings each exhibit a broad orange-yellow central band. From below, the forewings exhibit similar markings to those seen from above. The ventral surface of the hindwings exhibit sexual dichromatism: when viewed from below, males exhibit three large and several small silvery spots on the hindwings while the hindwings of females are marked with several brown rings instead. Pupae are pinkish-brown, marked with black dots and covered in a waxy white powder.

Behaviour and life cycle 
Adults fly quickly, feeding readily at flowers close to the ground but also high in the canopy. Adult females lay their eggs singly on leaves at the base of the species' host plants, which include several species of mat-rushes: Lomandra confertifolia, Lomandra laxa, Lomandra longifolia, Lomandra obliqua, and Lomandra spicata. Once hatched, the larvae construct a shelter at the base of the host plant, resting in their shelter during the day and emerging to feed at night. Larvae overwinter inside their larval shelters. Pupation may occur inside the larval shelter or in a curled dead leaf near the base of the host plant. Adults emerge primarily in January, but have been recorded from September to May.

References 

Butterflies of Australia
Insects of Australia
Hesperiidae
Trapezitinae
Butterflies described in 1884